Courchene is a surname. Notable people with the surname include:

Ken Courchene, First Nation chief in Canada
Tom Courchene (born 1940), Canadian economist and professor

See also
Courchesne